Live In Madrid is a live CD + DVD package by the Norwegian hard rock band TNT. It was the last TNT album recorded with vocalist Tony Harnell, who left the band in 2006.

Track listing - CD / DVD
"Invisible Noise"
"As Far as the Eye Can See"
"Downhill Racer"
"A Fix"
"She Needs Me"
"Give Me A Sign"
Guitar Solo
"Caught Between the Tigers"
"Listen to Your Heart"
"Black Butterfly"
"Seven Seas"
"Forever Shine On"
"Fantasia Española"
"My Religion"
"10,000 Lovers (In One)"
"Intuition"

Bonus material on DVD
"Everyone's a Star" (live at Sweden Rock Festival 2004)
Autograph session at the Deep Impact Festival (2004)
"She Needs Me" (live at Rockefeller Music Hall in Oslo, Norway 2004)

Personnel

Band 
Tony Harnell – vocals
Ronni Le Tekrø – guitars, background vocals
Victor Borge – bass guitar, background vocals
Diesel Dahl – drums, percussion

Additional personnel
Dag Stokke – keyboards, background vocals

Sources

http://www.melodic.net/newsOne.asp?newsId=6470

TNT (Norwegian band) albums
Live video albums
2006 live albums
2006 video albums